The Journal of Pharmacy and Bioallied Sciences is a quarterly medical journal. It is the official publication of the Organization of Pharmaceutical Unity with BioAllied Sciences. The current editor-in-chief is R.K. Khar.

Abstracting and indexing 
The journal is abstracted and indexed in EBSCO Databases, Health & Wellness Research Center, Health Reference Center Academic, ProQuest, PubMed/PubMed Central, Scopus, and Summon by Serial Solutions.

External links 
 
 Organization of Pharmaceutical Unity with BioAllied Sciences

Pharmacology journals
Quarterly journals
Publications established in 2009
Medknow Publications academic journals
English-language journals